Withnell is a civil parish in the Borough of Chorley, Lancashire, England.  It contains 19 buildings that are recorded in the National Heritage List for England as designated listed buildings, all of which are listed at Grade II.  This grade is the lowest of the three gradings given to listed buildings and is applied to "buildings of national importance and special interest".  Apart from the village of Withnell, the parish is mainly rural.  Many of the listed buildings are, or originated as, farmhouses or farm buildings.  The Leeds and Liverpool Canal runs through the parish, and six of the bridges crossing it are listed.  The other listed buildings include cottages, large houses, and a set of stocks.

Buildings

References

Citations

Sources

Lists of listed buildings in Lancashire
Buildings and structures in the Borough of Chorley